The Snapdragon Qualcomm VR820 is a virtual reality reference platform that was anticipated for release in Q4 2016 with the first commercial devices based on the platform expected to be available shortly thereafter.

Specifications
 Qualcomm Adreno 530 GPU for next-generation console-quality VR gaming and apps, while delivering up to 40 percent improvement to graphics performance and compute capabilities compared to its predecessor
 Smooth, stereoscopic 3D, with Foveated rendering, and support for the latest graphics APIs
 1440×1440 resolution per eye, AMOLED panel that supports up to 70 Hz
 360° 4K video playback processing with HEVC compression and display refresh rates at 70 FPS
 Qualcomm TruPalette display gamut mapping, color enhancement comprehensive control over colors
 Qualcomm EcoPix pixel compression, with a variable refresh for extended battery life

Sound

Stereo, binaural positional audio, and 3D surround sound, powered by Qualcomm Aqstic audio technologies
Four microphones with Fluence HD noise filtering and active noise cancellation

Other

Dual Qualcomm Spectra camera ISPs combined with Qualcomm Hexagon DSP for advanced vision features such as: look-through imaging and 3D reconstruction, eye-tracking, and hand gestures; predictive, monocular visual motion tracking with full 6DOF at 800 Hz for smooth tracking of head motion in movement as well as rotation; ultra-fast sensing, processing with average motion to photon latency under 18ms; custom-designed 64-bit Qualcomm Kryo quad-core CPU for high-performance computing; integrated Hexagon 680 DSP for efficiently processing advanced vision and audio; and Qualcomm All-Ways Aware ultra-low power "always-on" sensor technology without impacting CPU processing load.

References

Sources

Qualcomm software